Lake of the Woods County is a county in the northwestern part of the U.S. state of Minnesota. As of the 2020 census, the population was 3,763, making it the second-least populous county in Minnesota. Its county seat is Baudette.

The county contains the Northwest Angle, the northernmost point of the Lower 48 States, and the U.S. portion of Lake of the Woods, shared with Canada. The county also includes the exclave of Elm Point. Since Alaska has no counties, Lake of the Woods is the northernmost county in the United States. It is also the only county in the United States with four words in its name, although there is a parish in Louisiana called St. John the Baptist Parish, and the United States Census Bureau treats parishes as county equivalents for census purposes.

History
Lake of the Woods County was named for the lake that covers a large portion of it. Jacques de Noyon, a Frenchman who came from Trois Rivières, Quebec, explored the area in 1688 and was the first European to see the lake. He named it Lac aux Îles, "Lake of the Islands".

In 1885 the region got its first settler, Wilhelm Zippel, a German immigrant and fisherman. He settled on the lake's south shore in a place now called Zippel Bay. Shortly after, Alonzo Wheeler settled on the lake's southwest side at a place now called Wheeler's Point.

A wildfire, known as the Baudette fire of 1910, broke out in October of that year, burning  and destroying the towns of Spooner, Baudette, Graceton, Pitt, Williams, and Cedar Spur.

Lake of the Woods County's government was organized on January 1, 1923, with Baudette as the county seat. It is Minnesota's newest county; county voters approved separating the northern townships of Beltrami County into a separate unit on November 28, 1922.

Geography
Lake of the Woods County lies on Minnesota's border with Canada across the Rainy River, which flows northwest along the border to discharge into Lake of the Woods; its northwest border abuts Manitoba. The northern part of the county (the Northwest Angle) is separated from the rest of the county by the lake and thus has no land contact with the rest of the United States, making the Northwest Angle an exclave. Land access to that part of the county is through Manitoba. Access by water or ice routes is possible. The Rapid River flows northeast through the southeastern part of the county to its discharge point into the Rainy River, near the county's northeast corner.

Lake of the Woods County's terrain consists of low rolling hills, partly wooded, devoted to agriculture. The terrain slopes to the east and north. Its highest point is a small protuberance one mile (1.6 km) west of Norris Camp, at 1,316' (401m) ASL.

Major highways
  Minnesota State Highway 11
  Minnesota State Highway 72
  Minnesota State Highway 172

Adjacent counties and districts

 Kenora District, Ontario - northeast
 Rainy River District, Ontario - northeast
 Koochiching County - southeast
 Beltrami County - south
 Roseau County - west
 Rural Municipality of Piney, Manitoba - west
 Buffalo Point, Manitoba - west

Protected areas

 Beltrami Island State Forest (part)
 Garden Island State Recreation Area
 Mulligan Lake Peatland Scientific and Natural Area
 Norris Camp Peatland Scientific and Natural Area
 Pine Island State Forest (part)
 Red Lake Peatland Scientific and Natural Area (part)
 Winter Road Lakes Peatland Scientific and Natural Area
 Zippel Bay State Park

Lakes
 Browns Lake
 Lake of the Woods
 Lost Lake
 Winter Road Lake

Demographics

2020 census

As of the 2020 census, there were 3,763 people and 1,522 households in the county. The racial makeup of the county was 93.3% White, 0.3% Black or African American, 0.5% Native American, 0.4% Asian, and 4.3% were two or more races. Hispanic or Latinos were 1.5% of the population. The most common ancestries were German (26.3%), Norwegian (18.2%), and Swedish (10.2%). 99.0% of residents were born in the United States, and 98.8% spoken only English at home.

2000 census
As of the 2000 census, there were 4,522 people, 1,903 households, and 1,267 families in the county. The population density was 3.48/sqmi (1.35/km2). There were 3,238 housing units at an average density of 2.49/sqmi (0.96/km2). The racial makeup of the county was 97.21% White/Caucasian, 0.29% Black/African American, 1.13% Native American, 0.24% Asian, 0.11% from other races, and 1.02% from two or more races.  0.64% of the population were Hispanic or Latino of any race. 26.2% were of Norwegian, 22.3% German, 8.9% Swedish, 5.8% American and 5.0% English ancestry.

There were 1,903 households, out of which 29.20% had children under the age of 18 living with them, 57.40% were married couples living together, 5.30% had a female householder with no husband present, and 33.40% were non-families. 29.70% of all households were made up of individuals, and 12.90% had someone living alone who was 65 years of age or older.  The average household size was 2.35 and the average family size was 2.93.

The county population contained 24.70% under the age of 18, 5.70% from 18 to 24, 25.10% from 25 to 44, 27.20% from 45 to 64, and 17.20% who were 65 years of age or older. The median age was 42 years. For every 100 females there were 101.00 males. For every 100 females age 18 and over, there were 102.60 males.

The median income for a household in the county was $32,861, and the median income for a family was $38,936. Males had a median income of $30,469 versus $24,813 for females. The per capita income for the county was $16,976.  About 6.70% of families and 9.80% of the population were below the poverty line, including 8.30% of those under age 18 and 10.60% of those age 65 or over.

Communities

Cities
 Baudette (county seat)
 Roosevelt (partly in Roseau County)
 Williams

Census-designated place
 Angle Inlet

Unincorporated communities

 Arnesen
 Birch Beach
 Carp
 Clementson
 Faunce
 Graceton
 Hackett
 Long Point
 Lude
 Oak Island
 Penasse
 Pitt
 Sandy Shores
 Wheeler's Point

Townships
Although all the townships are named, as of 2001, there are no township governments. All the townships are officially part of unorganized territory.

 Angle Township
 Baudette Township
 Beaver Dam Township
 Boone Township
 Chilgren Township
 Cloverdale Township
 Eugene Township
 Forest Area Township
 Gudrid Township
 Hiwood Township
 Kiel Township
 Lakewood Township
 McDougald Township
 Meadowland Township
 Myhre Township
 Norris Township
 Noyes Township
 Park Township
 Pioneer Township
 Potamo Township
 Prosper Township
 Rapid River Township
 Rulien Township
 Spooner Township
 Swiftwater Township
 Township 157-30
 Township 158-30
 Victory Township
 Wabanica Township
 Walhalla Township
 Wheeler Township
 Zippel Township

Government and politics
Lake of the Woods County usually votes Republican. As of 2016 the county has selected the Republican candidate in 78% of presidential elections since 1980. The last time the county voted for a Democratic presidential candidate was 1996, when Bill Clinton won it (as well as Minnesota as a whole).

See also

 National Register of Historic Places listings in Lake of the Woods County, Minnesota

References

External links
 Lake of the Woods County government website
 Local tourist bureau website
 Link to Woods Square woodlands

 
Minnesota counties
1922 establishments in Minnesota
Populated places established in 1922